Quadring Fen is a hamlet in the South Holland district of Lincolnshire, England.

Quadring Fen forms part of the Lincolnshire Fens which was an area of low-lying land prone to flooding prior to drainage works being carried out between 1635 and 1638.

Demographics
At the time of the 2011 census the civil parish had a population of 256.

This breaks down into:

132 Male

124 Female

253 White, 3 Mixed ethnicity

Commerce and amenities
There used to be a public house in the village called The Old Plough Inn on the corner of South Drove and Quadring Bank. The publican in 1919 was George Hempsall, and it was owned by the Soulby, Son & Winch brewery until 1951 when it was purchased by JW Green of Luton. It was closed for business on 14 May 1962 and subsequently converted for residential use.

The South Forty Foot drain runs through Quadring Fen and there is a pump house situated at the end of South Drove. The Forty foot drain is a pump assisted principal drainage channel for the Fens of Eastern England that was first cut in the 17th century.

References

External links

Hamlets in Lincolnshire
South Holland, Lincolnshire